John B. Preston was the first Surveyor General of the Oregon Territory in the Western United States. 

Preston was appointed by President Millard Fillmore to create a system for surveying land in the territory; Preston lost his position in 1853, and "drifted into obscurity."

References

External links 
 

People from Oregon
American surveyors
Year of birth missing
Year of death missing